Schwabach is a river of Bavaria, Germany. It is a right tributary of the Regnitz in Erlangen.

See also
List of rivers of Bavaria

References

Rivers of Bavaria
Erlangen-Höchstadt
Erlangen
Forchheim (district)
Rivers of Germany